In United States politics and government, the term presidential nominee has two different meanings:

 A candidate for president of the United States who has been selected by the delegates of a political party at the party's national convention (also called a presidential nominating convention) to be that party's official candidate for the presidency.
 A person nominated by a sitting U.S. president to an executive or judicial post, subject to the advice and consent of the Senate. (See Appointments Clause, List of positions filled by presidential appointment with Senate confirmation.)

Presumptive nominee 
In United States presidential elections, the presumptive nominee is a presidential candidate who is assumed to be their party's nominee, but has not yet been formally nominated or elected by their political party at the party's nominating convention. Ordinarily, a candidate becomes the presumptive nominee of their party when their "last serious challenger drops out" or when the candidate "mathematically clinches—whichever comes first. But there is still room for interpretation." A candidate mathematically clinches a nomination by securing a simple majority (i.e., more than 50 percent) of delegates through the primaries and caucuses prior to the convention. The time at which news organizations begin to refer to a candidate as the "presumptive nominee" varies from election to election. The shift in media usage from "front-runner" to "presumptive nominee" is considered a significant change for a campaign.

In the modern era, it is the norm for the major political parties' nominees to be "clear well before the conventions"; in the past, however, some conventions have begun with the outcome in doubt, requiring multiple rounds of balloting to select a nominee. The last major party conventions with more than one ballot for president occurred in 1972 for the Democrats and 1948 for the Republicans.

Losing candidates, after withdrawing from the primary race, often "release" their delegates, who frequently declare support for the presumptive nominee.

A presumptive nominee typically will have already selected a vice presidential running mate before the convention—see veepstakes. In the past, the choice of vice presidential nominee has been made by the convention itself.

The term "presumptive nominee" is disliked by some writers; language commentator William Safire called it a "bogus title" and preferred the phrase presumed nominee, which was used by The New York Times in 2004.

See also 
 List of United States presidential candidates
 Preselection
 Prospective parliamentary candidate

References 

United States presidential elections terminology